"Who Shot Mr. Burns?" is a two-part episode of the American animated television series The Simpsons. Part One is the twenty-fifth and final episode of the sixth season and originally aired on the Fox network in the United States on May 21, 1995, while Part Two is the season premiere of the seventh season and aired on September 17, 1995. Springfield Elementary School strikes oil, but Mr. Burns steals it and at the same time brings misery to many of Springfield's citizens. Part One has a cliffhanger ending where Mr. Burns is shot by an unidentified assailant. In Part Two, Springfield's police try to find the culprit, with their main suspects being Waylon Smithers and Homer Simpson.

Both episodes were written by Bill Oakley and Josh Weinstein; Part One was directed by Jeffrey Lynch and Part Two by Wes Archer. Musician Tito Puente guest stars as himself in both parts. "Who Shot Mr. Burns?" was conceived by series creator Matt Groening and the writing staff decided to turn it into a two-part mystery episode. Part One contains several clues about the identity of the culprit because the writers wanted it to be solvable.

Plot

Part One
While burying the deceased 4th grade gerbil, Super Dude, Groundskeeper Willie discovers oil under Springfield Elementary School. Principal Skinner and Superintendent Chalmers accept suggestions from students and staff on how to spend their newfound wealth, including Lisa's suggestion of hiring Tito Puente as a music teacher. Mr. Burns disguises himself as Jimbo Jones and unsuccessfully tries to trick Skinner into selling him the drilling rights to secure an energy monopoly over Springfield.

At the Springfield Nuclear Power Plant, Homer is increasingly upset that Burns can never remember his name. On Marge's suggestion, he sends Burns a box of chocolates with a family picture underneath the candy. However, Burns and Smithers are not interested in the one candy covering Homer's face and discard the box. As a result, Burns writes a "thank you" card only to Marge, Bart, Lisa, and Maggie, further angering Homer.

Meanwhile, Burns plots to take the school's oil, of which Smithers disapproves. Burns establishes a slant drilling operation and beats the school to tapping the oil well. Burns' drilling operation causes distress to many Springfield citizens: Willie and Puente are laid off; Moe's Tavern is closed due to the harmful fumes from the drilling, enraging Moe and Barney; the drilling destroys the Springfield Retirement Castle, forcing Grampa to move in with the Simpsons; and Bart's treehouse is destroyed by a burst of oil from the rig, which also injures Santa's Little Helper.

Burns reveals to Smithers his grandest scheme: the construction of a giant disc that will permanently block out the sun in Springfield, forcing the residents to continuously use the electricity from his plant. When Smithers says he has gone too far, Burns fires him. Homer, driven to insanity by Burns not knowing his name, sneaks into his office and spray paints "I am Homer Simpson" on the wall. Burns catches him in the act but still fails to remember him. In a rage, Homer attacks him and is hauled away by security. All the citizens affected by Burns' schemes, including Homer and Smithers, swear vengeance.

A town meeting is held to discuss Burns' actions. Burns arrives, armed with a gun after his encounter with Homer, and activates the sun-blocking device. He walks into an alley and struggles with someone until a gun fires. Wounded, Burns stumbles and collapses onto the town's sundial, falling into unconsciousness. The townspeople find him and Marge tells all of them that since he has angered so many people recently, anyone could have been the shooter. Chief Wiggum agrees to start the investigation to find the culprit.

Part Two
With Burns hospitalized, the Springfield police search for his assailant. Smithers vaguely remembers shooting someone the night before in a drunken rage. Guilt-ridden, he heads for a local church, and is promptly arrested when the confessional turns out to be a police sting. While passing the media on his way to the police station, Smithers makes a witty remark that Sideshow Mel recognizes from an episode of the fictional Comedy Central program, Pardon My Zinger that aired at the same time as the shooting. Mel realizes Smithers must have watched it as well, giving him an alibi. Mel and Krusty head to the police station as Smithers' memory clears. It turns out he had actually shot Jasper in his wooden leg. Meanwhile, the townspeople pull down the sun-blocker, which crushes Shelbyville to their delight.

With one of the prime suspects cleared, the police, aided by Lisa, eliminate other suspects, including Puente, Skinner, Willie, and Moe. After a surreal dream involving Lisa, Wiggum finds an eyelash on Mr. Burns' suit that matches Simpson DNA. At the same time, Burns wakes up from his coma, exclaiming "Homer Simpson!" The police conclude that Homer shot Burns as revenge for not remembering his name. They raid the Simpson home and find a gun under the seat of their car, covered with Homer's fingerprints and loaded with bullets matching the one fired into Burns, resulting in Homer being arrested for attempted murder. On the way to jail, the paddywagon overturns at the Krusty Burger drive-thru and Homer escapes.

At the hospital, it is revealed "Homer Simpson" is the only thing Burns can say, suggesting his "accusation" may not have actually been one. Lisa returns to the scene of the crime to investigate. At the same time, Homer arrives at the hospital to confront his boss. After a police bulletin reports Homer's location, the police, Lisa, and many other citizens of Springfield race to the hospital. Upon entering Burns' room, everyone finds an enraged Homer vigorously shaking Burns. This returns Burns' ability to speak normally, but when he asks who is shaking him, this pushes Homer over the edge at Burns forgetting his name again. Grabbing Wiggum's pistol, Homer threatens to kill Burns if he does not take back accusing him of shooting him before. However, Burns calms Homer down and confirms Homer did not shoot him. He then reveals the true assailant upon seeing them in the crowd of citizens: Maggie.

After leaving the town meeting, Burns came across Maggie eating a lollipop in the Simpsons' car. He decided to try stealing candy from a baby, but Maggie struggled against him. As Burns yanked the lollipop away, his gun slipped from its holster into Maggie's hands and discharged. The gun fell beneath the car seat, and Homer would unknowingly leave fingerprints on the gun while reaching under the seat for an ice cream cone he dropped. Burns demands for Maggie to be arrested, but he is dismissed by Wiggum, who says no jury would convict a baby for a crime, except maybe Texas. Marge also adds the shooting must have been an accident, considering Maggie is an infant. In the final shot, Maggie is shown with shifty eyes as she sucks her pacifier, implying she shot Burns intentionally, possibly for all the trouble he caused to her family.

Production

The idea for the episode came from series creator Matt Groening, who had wanted to do an episode in which Mr. Burns was shot, which could be used as a publicity stunt. The writers decided to write the episode in two parts with a mystery that could be used in a contest. It was important for them to design a mystery that had clues, took advantage of freeze frame technology, and was structured around one character who seemed to be the obvious culprit. While deciding who the culprit was, Oakley and Weinstein pitched Barney Gumble because he was a character that could go to jail and it could change the dynamic of the show. Mirkin suggested Maggie because he felt it was funnier and wanted the culprit to be a Simpsons family member. Bart Simpson has a minor role in the second part, despite this episode having less comedy and more drama.

The producers worked hard to keep the ending of the episode a secret. While it was in production, David Silverman was the only animator who knew who the culprit was. Wes Archer, director of the episode, was initially unaware of the solution and directed the episode up until the conclusion. When it was time to animate the ending of the show, Silverman and Archer waited until the end of the summer of 1995 to work on it. They realized they needed help with the layouts and started giving various animators small parts to work on without telling them who the culprit was. The table read for the episode also ended before the third act. The writers had wanted the clues that were animated to be just right, so there were many animation retakes. Oakley and Weinstein were initially unsure about having Maggie as the culprit, and it was decided that the episode would end with Maggie shifting her eyes and making it look like it was not a complete accident.

Tito Puente and his Latin jazz ensemble appear in the episode and sing the song "Señor Burns". Oakley and Weinstein were unfamiliar with Puente and wrote him into the episode because Groening is a fan. They figured he would sing the song, but later discovered that Puente was a drummer, not a singer. The lyrics were sung by one of Puente's band members. His band would also play their version of The Simpsons' theme over the end credits.

Hidden clues

A number of subtle clues, and a few red herrings, were planted in Part One for viewers who wanted to unravel the mystery.
 Almost every clock is set at three or nine o'clock. The point of the clocks was to teach the viewer to view the sundial at the end upside down.
 Mr. Burns looks from his balcony and talks about stealing candy from a baby.
 The box of chocolates Homer sends Burns is lined with a Simpsons family photo, and as Burns and Smithers gorge on the candy, Maggie is the first Simpson the audience sees. 
 When Mr. Burns collapses on the sundial, he points at W and S, although from his viewpoint, the W looks like an M.
 Many of the suspects have the letters S and either W or M in their initials, and the intention was that several "obvious" suspects could be eliminated by the letters. Several characters already had names with those initials, but some were made up specifically for this episode.
 Principal Skinner's full name is revealed to be "W. Seymour Skinner" on a diploma in his office.
 Smithers's full name is "Waylon Smithers."
 Mr. Burns calls Santa's Little Helper the "Simpson Mutt".
 Moe's liquor license reveals that his full name is Moe Szyslak.
 Melvin Van Horne is known to everyone by his stage name "Sideshow Mel".
 Grampa's gun is a Smith & Wesson.
 Just before entering Mr. Burns' office to spray paint his name, Homer passes in front of the words "ONLY IN" on the pavement (upside down from the viewer's perspective), and very briefly blocks all of the letters except "NO" and a small arrow pointing at him.
 A television in Moe's Tavern shows that "Pardon My Zinger" is broadcast on weekdays at 3 p.m. on Comedy Central. It is later revealed that Burns is shot at 3 p.m. Smithers reveals at the meeting that he never misses the show, and afterward is seen heading in the opposite direction that Burns heads.
 During the scene at the town hall, several citizens are seen stroking guns: Smithers and an unidentified woman have revolvers, Moe has a shotgun, Skinner has a semi-automatic pistol with a suppressor attached, and Barney has a derringer. Snake arrives with a revolver.
 Also during the town hall scene, Mr. Burns smugly asks the townspeople “Who here has the guts to stop me?”, followed by a panning shot of the townspeople glaring at Mr. Burns before each looking away in reluctance. During this shot, Maggie, at the bottom of the screen in Marge's arms, was the only one to continue glaring.
 As Mr. Burns collapses on the sundial, it is seen that the holster under his arm is empty. This was inserted as an intentional freeze frame clue to show that he had been shot with his own gun.

Alternate endings
Due to the amount of interest in the ending of this episode, David Mirkin wrote several "terrible endings" and, with just Harry Shearer, recorded several alternate endings. His original intention was to fool the production staff and also leak the endings to various media outlets, but much to his surprise he was unsuccessful. Several endings were animated that showed various characters shooting Mr. Burns. Several of the alternate endings aired during the clip show "The Simpsons 138th Episode Spectacular". Various clips showed Barney, Tito, Moe, Apu, and even Santa's Little Helper as the gunmen. There was also a full-length conclusion that aired in which Smithers shot Burns and explained his doing so at Burns' bedside after Homer's wild chase, and fell on "W" and S" on the compass, Waylon's initials; Burns then decides to give Smithers a 5 percent pay cut for attempting to kill him.

Conspiracy theories
Over the years, fan conspiracy theories have emerged arguing that Maggie did not shoot Mr. Burns as it was revealed at the end of part 2, and instead Mr. Burns was actually shot by characters such as Marge, Lisa, Grandpa, Bart, and Homer. In April 2020, a viral post compared Krusty's appearance in the final scene of Part One to how Homer looked when he dressed as him in Homie the Clown, leading to people thinking that Homer wanted to frame Krusty for Burns' attempted murder by posing as him. Writer Bill Oakley said on Twitter that it was an animation error. In addition, released animation notes for the final scene stated that Homer was not supposed to appear.

Contest
In the months following the broadcast of Part One, there was widespread debate among fans of the series as to who shot Mr. Burns. Fox offered a contest to tie in with the mystery where callers who dialed 1-800-COLLECT were eligible and they then guessed who the culprit was.  It ran from August 13 to September 10 and was one of the first contests to tie together elements of television and the Internet. Fox launched a new website, Springfield.com, devoted to the mystery that got over 500,000 hits during the summer of 1995. The winner would be animated on an episode of the show. Due to contest regulations, a winner had to be selected out of a random sample of entries, whether the entries contained correct responses or not. The sample did not contain any correct answers, and so a winner (who had the wrong answer) was chosen at random. However, the winner, Fayla Gibson of Washington D.C., did not watch the show and opted to accept a cash prize in lieu of being animated. 

The contest is referenced at the end of Part 1 when Dr. Hibbert, ostensibly breaking the fourth wall, says: "Well, I couldn't possibly solve this mystery... Can you?"

On the DVD commentary, Bill Oakley and Josh Weinstein remarked that they knew of only one person who had correctly guessed Maggie was the shooter based on the several clues in the episode. The individual had made a post on an online forum and the writers wanted to give them a special gift, but due to the contest regulations, Oakley and Weinstein were unable to contact them until after the contest had concluded. By that time, Oakley was unable to find the anonymous poster and on the DVD commentary, Oakley was still searching for the individual to give them a prize.

Springfield's Most Wanted
Springfield's Most Wanted was a TV special hosted by John Walsh, host of America's Most Wanted. The special aired on September 17, 1995, before Part Two of "Who Shot Mr. Burns?" A parody of Walsh's television series, this special was designed to help people find out who shot Mr. Burns, by laying out the potential clues and identifying the possible suspects. It features opinions from former Los Angeles police chief Daryl Gates and predictions from Dennis Franz, Courtney Thorne-Smith, Kevin Nealon, Chris Elliott, and Andrew Shue. The special also included oddsmaker Jimmy Vaccaro of The Mirage casino and hotel in Las Vegas, who had been taking bets on the shooter's identity; a brief look at the casino's tote board shows Homer as the favorite with 2:1 odds, while Maggie was a longshot at 70:1. It was directed by Bill Brown and written by Jack Parmeter and Bob Bain.

The special was criticized for taking the publicity of the episode too far. Several critics said the special tainted host John Walsh's credibility and was described as gimmicky, tacky, and "blatant groveling for viewers". The special averaged an 8.4 Nielsen Rating and finished 50th in the United States in the ratings for the week of September 11–17, 1995.

Cultural references
The title and concept for these two episodes were taken from the series Dallas. In the "Who shot J. R.?" plot line, J. R. Ewing is shot in the season finale. The identity of the assailant was not revealed until the following season, leaving viewers to wonder for months which of Ewing's many enemies was the culprit.

When Mr. Burns refers to his package at the beginning of the episode, he states that it "absolutely, positively" has to arrive in Pasadena, California, the following day, a reference to an early FedEx slogan. The song Mr. Burns sings to a lamp-post echo the lyrics of Simon & Garfunkel's song "The 59th Street Bridge Song (Feelin' Groovy)". The musical score that ends the first episode (when the credits roll) is a parody of John Williams' Drummers' Salute, which is part of the musical score he composed for Oliver Stone's film JFK. During the scene in Part One where Moe's bar is closed, an episode of Mystery Science Theater 3000 is playing on the television in the background following a promotion for the fictional program Pardon My Zinger at 3:00 pm.

The opening of Part Two, wherein Smithers realizes that he merely dreamed about shooting Mr. Burns, is a reference to the episode "Blast from the Past" from Dallas, in which the events of the entire ninth season were explained away as being merely a character's dream. The dream itself, in which Smithers and Burns are undercover detectives on the 1960s Speedway racing circuit, parodied The Mod Squad. Groundskeeper Willie's interrogation, and particularly his crossing and uncrossing his legs, is a parody of Sharon Stone's famous interrogation scene in Basic Instinct. The nightclub is called 'Chez Guevara', a reference to Communist revolutionary Che Guevara.

Homer's escape from the overturned paddy wagon is a homage to the 1993 film The Fugitive. Chief Wiggum's dream in which Lisa speaks backwards is a reference to Twin Peaks and Special Agent Dale Cooper's interaction with the Man from Another Place. While recording Lisa's lines for the segment, Yeardley Smith recorded the part backwards; the recording was in turn reversed, a technique known as phonetic reversal, the same technique used on Twin Peaks. Several other parts out of the segment are direct references to the dream, including a moving shadow on the curtain, and Wiggum's hair standing straight up after waking.

A mug shot of a battered and bruised Homer Simpson is shown, in which he is wearing a T-shirt with the campaign slogan "Haig in '88" on it, a reference to Alexander Haig's unsuccessful run for the 1988 Republican Party presidential nomination.

Reception

Critical reception
In 2003, Entertainment Weekly published a Top 25 The Simpsons episode list and placed both parts of "Who Shot Mr. Burns?" in 25th place, saying, "a two-part comedic homage to Dallas' Who shot J.R.? stunt, [Who Shot Mr. Burns] is perhaps The Simpsons' most grandiose pop moment ever". The Daily Telegraph characterized the episode as one of "The 10 Best Simpsons TV Episodes". Entertainment.ie named it among the 10 greatest Simpsons episodes of all time. When The Simpsons began streaming on Disney+ in 2019, Oakley named Part One one of the best classic Simpsons episodes to watch on the service.

The authors of the book I Can't Believe It's a Bigger and Better Updated Unofficial Simpsons Guide, Warren Martyn and Adrian Wood, called it "A superb end to the season—and what's more, it's a genuine whodunnit. There's no cheating—all the clues are there." Jake Rossen of Wizard called the ending the sixth-greatest cliffhanger of all time but expressed disappointment in the resolution, saying: "Sometimes it's better to make up your own ending, kids." In 2008, Entertainment Weekly included Part One in their list of the best television season finales of all time.

The song "Señor Burns", which was composed by Alf Clausen and written by Oakley and Weinstein, was nominated for a Primetime Emmy Award in 1996 for "Outstanding Individual Achievement in Music and Lyrics". Tito Puente ranked 19th on AOL's list of their favorite 25 Simpsons guest stars.

Ratings
Part One finished 51st with a Nielsen rating of 8.7, the fifth-highest-rated Fox show of the week. Part Two averaged 12.3 million households and a 12.9 Nielsen rating. It finished sixteenth in the United States in the ratings for the week of September 11–17, 1995, finishing first in its time slot and was the highest-rated show on the Fox network that week. It helped the Fox network rank third overall for that week at a time when Fox was usually finishing fourth.

References

Bibliography

External links

The Simpsons (season 6) episodes
The Simpsons (season 7) episodes
1995 American television episodes
Black comedy
Television episodes set in hospitals
Television episodes about murder